Mindlin is a surname. Notable people with the surname include:

 Alexander Borisovich Mindlin (1929–2019), Russian engineer
 Gabriel B. Mindlin, Argentine physicist
 José Mindlin (1914–2010), Brazilian lawyer, businessperson, and bibliophile
 Raymond D. Mindlin (1906–1987), American mechanical engineer